Snap general elections were held in Sint Maarten on 26 February 2018 following a no confidence vote in the Second Marlin cabinet.

Background

In November 2017, a motion of no confidence against Prime Minister William Marlin and some other ministers was accepted in Parliament, due to Marlin's position in the negotiation with the Dutch government about anti fraud measures and aid funds in the aftermath of Hurricanes Irma and Maria. After the motion of no confidence was accepted, Marlin tendered the resignation of his cabinet to governor Eugene Holiday and requested elections to be held. It is the second early election in a row since the Gumbs cabinet fell in 2015.

Electoral system
The 15 seats in the Estates were elected by proportional representation. In order to participate in the election, new parties and parties without a seat in parliament were required to obtain at least 142 signatures; 1% of the valid votes of the 2016 parliamentary elections.

Results

References

Elections in Sint Maarten
Sint Maarten
2018 in Sint Maarten